Bernard Ban (born 8 March 1961) is a Croatian wrestler. He competed in the men's Greco-Roman 90 kg at the 1988 Summer Olympics.

References

External links
 

1961 births
Living people
Croatian male sport wrestlers
Olympic wrestlers of Yugoslavia
Wrestlers at the 1988 Summer Olympics
Sportspeople from Zagreb